Paraperlucidibaca is a genus of Gram-negative, non-spore-forming, rod-shaped bacteria which belongs to the class Gammaproteobacteria.

References

Moraxellaceae
Bacteria genera